Fair and Warmer is a three-act comedy play by the American writer Avery Hopwood. It was first staged at the Eltinge Theatre in New York City on November 15, 1915, running for 377 performances, featuring Madge Kennedy, John Cumberland, Janet Beecher, Ralph Morgan, Hamilton Revelle, Olive May, Robert Fisher and Harry Lorraine. Staged by Robert Milton, it was well received by critics. It is a farce about a mild-mannered banker who becomes embroiled in an innocent scheme to rekindle the romance in his marriage using his best friend's wife.

Plot
Friends Laura Bartlett and Jack Wheeler enjoy going out partying, but their respective spouses, Billy Bartlett and Blanche Wheeler, do not. One evening when Laura and Jack are out together, Billy and Blanche decide to try partying themselves. The inexperienced drinkers mix a cocktail so potent that they pass out together after one drink, leading their spouses to think they are having an affair. Blanche returns the next day to apologize, but Laura has already decided to leave Billy and is having the furniture removed. The misunderstanding is resolved by Tessie, the Barletts' maid.

Cast and characters
The characters and cast from the Broadway production are given below:

Reception
The reviewer for The New York Times praised the play as well-written and the acting of the Broadway cast, especially Kennedy and Cumberland.

Film adaptations
In 1919 the play was turned into an American silent film of the same title.

The 1937 German comedy The Model Husband with Heinz Rühmann was based on Hopwood's play and was followed up by West German and Swiss remakes in 1956 and 1959 respectively.

A Swedish film version The Green Lift was made in 1944, another Swedish film version The Green Lift in 1952, a Danish film version  was made in 1961, and a Norwegian film version Den grønne heisen in 1981.

References

Bibliography
 Fisher, James & Hardison Londre, Felicia. The A to Z of American Theater: Modernism. Rowman & Littlefield, 2009.

External links

Script from the Federal Theatre Project Collection

1915 plays
American plays adapted into films
Broadway plays
Comedy plays
Plays by Avery Hopwood